Balga is a suburb of Perth, the capital city of Western Australia,  north of Perth city's central business district (CBD). Its local government area is the City of Stirling. Mark Irwin is the current mayor.

The name "Balga" was adopted in 1954 and is the Noongar (Aboriginal) word for the indigenous grass tree Xanthorrhoea preissii. It was designed by the State Housing Commission along with Nollamara and Westminster as part of the "Mirrabooka Project", and the laying of streets and building of homes commenced in the 1960s.

Geography

Demographics
At the 2011 census, Balga had a population of 10,701.

Balga residents had a median age of 31, and median incomes were well below average for the Perth metropolitan area and the region — $490 per week compared with $669 per week in Perth, and $685 in the Perth North West statistical region. The population of Balga was more ethnically diverse than the Perth average, with 49.1% born in Australia and significant minorities from Sudan, Italy, Macedonia, Vietnam and Burma identified in the 2011 census. At the 2011 census, 3.72% of residents identified as Indigenous Australians.

Education
Balga contains a state high school, Balga Senior High School which opened in 1970; three state primary schools, Balga (1965), North Balga (1968) and Warriapendi (1970); one special school, the Gladys Newton School; and one private school, Majella Catholic Primary School (1971). Additionally, a campus of North Metropolitan TAFE (formerly known as Polytechnic West) is in the southeast of the suburb.

Balga Senior High School includes an Intensive English Centre for newly arrived refugee students, a program for teenage parents, a sports-based education program for indigenous students, and an emphasis on literacy, numeracy, health and careers through all levels of the school. It is one of the few high schools in Western Australia not to offer a Western Australian Certificate of Education (WACE) program, although several students each year complete a university preparation course conducted by Edith Cowan University.

Transport
The suburb is served by a number of Transperth bus routes operated by Swan Transit (374-375, 385-389) and Path Transit (371 and 376). The 374 (Mirrabooka-Darch-Whitfords) and 375 (Mirrabooka-Alexander Heights) covers Marangaroo Drive and inner portions of the Suburb, the 389 (Perth–Wanneroo) covers Wanneroo Road, and the 386 (Perth–Kingsway City Shopping Centre, Madeley), 385(Perth to Kingsway City Shopping Centre, Madeley)(limited stops), 371 (Warwick Station to Mirrabooka Station via Treen St) routes along with various routes from Mirrabooka bus station, 376 covers eastern end of the suburb and 449 covers for the northern end.

References 

Suburbs of Perth, Western Australia
Suburbs in the City of Stirling